Sarcolaena humbertiana is a species of plant in the Sarcolaenaceae family. It is endemic to Madagascar.  Its natural habitat is subtropical or tropical moist lowland forests. It is threatened by habitat loss.

References

Endemic flora of Madagascar
humbertiana
Critically endangered plants
Taxonomy articles created by Polbot